Embalam is a legislative assembly constituency in the Union territory of Puducherry in India. Embalam assembly constituency was part of Puducherry (Lok Sabha constituency). This assembly constituency is reserved for SC candidates.

Segments
Embalam
Sembiyapalayam
Korkadu
Karikalampakkam
Aranganur
Kirumampakkam
Pillaiarkuppam
Seliamedu

Members of Legislative Assembly

Election results

2021

See also
 List of constituencies of the Puducherry Legislative Assembly
 Puducherry district

References 

Assembly constituencies of Puducherry